Jack Finck (21 January 1930 – 31 October 2012) was an Australian rules footballer who played for Collingwood in the Victorian Football League (VFL) during the early 1950s.

Finck, who Collingwood recruited from Heathmere, was a key position defender. As a result, he kicked just eight goals in his career but half of them came in a single match, when he helped his side to defeat Carlton at Princes Park in 1953. Later that year, Finck, having missed out on a premiership in 1952 when Collingwood lost the Grand Final, got another opportunity when he was their full-back in the team which defeated Geelong in the decider.

After just four seasons and despite being aged just 24, Finck retired, citing the long commute from Portland for home games.

References

Holmesby, Russell and Main, Jim (2007). The Encyclopedia of AFL Footballers. 7th ed. Melbourne: Bas Publishing.

1930 births
Australian rules footballers from Victoria (Australia)
Collingwood Football Club players
Collingwood Football Club Premiership players
2012 deaths
One-time VFL/AFL Premiership players